The Journal of Deaf Studies and Deaf Education is a peer-reviewed academic journal covering basic and applied research relating to individuals who are deaf, including developmental, cultural, educational, and linguistic topics.

Abstracting and indexing 
The journal is indexed and abstracted in: CINAHL, Current Contents® /Social and Behavioral Sciences, Education Research Abstracts, E-psyche, Journal Citation Reports /Social Sciences Edition, Linguistics & Language Behavior Abstracts, MEDLINE with Full Text, ProQuest 5000 International, ProQuest Central, ProQuest Health & Medical Complete, ProQuest Medical Library, ProQuest Nursing & Allied Health Source, ProQuest Pharma Collection, ProQuest Psychology Journals, ProQuest Wilson Databases, PsycINFO Database with Full Text, Psychlit, Social Sciences Citation Index®, Social Scisearch®, Studies on Women and Gender Abstracts, The Standard Periodical Directory, and Wilson OmniFile Full Text Mega Edition.

References

External links 
 

Deaf studies journals
Publications established in 1996
Quarterly journals
Oxford University Press academic journals
English-language journals